The Bureau of Safety and Environmental Enforcement (BSEE  "Bessie") is an agency under the United States Department of the Interior. Established in 2011, BSEE is the lead agency in charge of improving safety and ensuring environmental protection relating to the offshore energy industry, mainly natural gas and oil, on the United States Outer Continental Shelf (OCS). The agency exercises the safety and environmental enforcement functions formerly under the Minerals Management Service including the authority to inspect, investigate, summon witnesses and produce evidence, levy penalties, cancel or suspend activities, and oversee safety, response, and removal preparedness.

History
The BSEE was established in response to the regulatory failure of Minerals Management Service (MMS) in the Deepwater Horizon oil spill of 2010. Secretarial Order 3299 signed by then Secretary of the Interior Ken Salazar on May 19, 2010, created the agency. Order 3299 also created the Bureau of Ocean Energy Management (BOEM) and the Office of Natural Resources Revenue (ONRR).

The creation of the three independent entities was designed to carry out three missions:
 Ensuring the balance and responsible development of energy resources on the Outer Continental Shelf (OCS)
 Ensuring safe and environmentally responsible exploration and production and enforcing applicable rules and regulations
 Ensuring a fair return to the taxpayer from offshore royalty and revenue collection and disbursement activities
On June 18, 2010, Secretarial Order 3302 briefly renamed the MMS to the Bureau of Ocean Energy Management, Regulation and Enforcement (BOEMRE). This name was in effect until the official establishment of the BSEE on October 1, 2011.  On September 16, 2011, Salazar named former MMS Director Michael R. Bromwich as the BSEE's first director.  On November 14, 2011, Salazar named Coast Guard Rear Admiral James A. Watson as the BSEE's second director.

On August 14, 2013, Interior Secretary Sally Jewell named former Coast Guard Vice Admiral Brian Salerno as the BSEE's third director. In 2013, the BSEE and the U.S. Department of Transportation Statistics (BTS) signed an Interagency Agreement (IAA) to create SafeOCS, for voluntary confidential reporting of ‘near misses’ happening on Outer Continental Shelf. It was later expanded to include mandatory reporting of equipment failure data as required in 30 CFR 250.730 and 30 CFR 250.803.

In 2016, the BSEE finalized Well Control Rule. Phased in over time (starting on July 28, 2016), the reform will establish regulations to prevent another Deepwater Horizon tragedy and other well control incidents. In addition, it will implement new and revised industry standards as well as codification of decades worth of BSEE policies.

Key points of Well Control Rule:
 Incorporate industry standards as baseline
 Establish criteria for maintenance and repair of blowout preventers (BOP) 
 Safe drilling practices and procedures
 Real time monitoring requirements
 Third party certification programs

In 2016, NASA and the BSEE entered into a five-year interagency agreement (IAA). Under the agreement, NASA will assist BSEE in further developing risk management using NASA's probabilistic risk assessment (PRA) technique.  In February 2016, the Government Accountability Office determined that the reorganization had made only limited progress in enhancing BSEE's investigative and enforcement capabilities. In March 2017, the GAO determined that BSEE had not successfully implemented its strategic or management initiatives.

On May 23, 2017, Interior Secretary Ryan Zinke named former Louisiana interim-Lieutenant Governor Scott Angelle as the BSEE's fourth director.  On January 20, 2021, Angelle resigned.

On March 28, 2022, Kevin M. Sligh Sr. was appointed as the BSEE's fifth director.

Divisions

Office of Offshore Regulatory Programs (OORP) 
The Office of Offshore Regulatory Programs (OORP) manages rules, standards and compliance programs in charge of oil, gas and mineral operations on the Outer Continental Shelf. Branches under the OORP are responsible for regulations and associated policy documents of the OCS. Additionally, programs cover safety management, pollution prevention research, technology assessments, inspection policies and development of BSEE's technical training.

Oil Spill Preparedness Division (OSPD) 
The BSEE oversees oil spill planning and preparedness for oil and gas production facilities in U.S. waters (see 30 CFR part 254). Some of the main functions of its Oil Spill Preparedness Division (OSPD) division include the approval of oil spill response plans; inspection of oil spill response equipment; conducting oil spill response research, auditing responder and management team training and exercises. OSPD currently manages the Ohmsett National Spill Response Test Facility, located in Leonardo, New Jersey.

Environmental Compliance Division (ECD) 
The Environmental Compliance Division (ECD) monitors, verifies and enforces the offshore industry's compliance with environmental standards in operations on the Outer Continental Shelf (OCS). ECD is responsible for compliancy with the National Environmental Policy Act (NEPA) in regards to BSEE's OCS operations. Other responsibilities include coordination with the Bureau of Ocean Energy Management (BOEM) and other Federal, State and local agencies; and public outreach regarding environmental compliance. Engineers and scientists working under the ECD, are BSEE's national coordinators for various environmental programs including Air Quality, Archaeological and Cultural Resources; Marine Ecology, Marine Trash and Debris Oversight; and the Rigs-to-Reefs (R2R) Artificial Reef Program

Safety & Incident Investigation Division (SIID) 
The Safety and Incident Division (SIID) is responsible for establishing national policies relating to the conduct of investigations of safety incidents happening on the OCS. This division also establishes national policies regarding investigator training. SIID at the BSEE headquarters in Washington D.C., manages the National Investigations Program and coordinates the training for investigators and provides support to the regional and district levels.

Budget
As of 2016, the BSEE has a $204.6 million budget and 881 full-time employees (FTE), requesting $204.8 million and no increase in FTE for fiscal year 2017.

Offices
Regional offices are in Anchorage, Alaska; Camarillo, California; New Orleans, Louisiana and district offices along the Gulf of Mexico coast.

Publications

BSEE Annual Reports 
Annual reports from The Bureau of Safety and Environmental Enforcement (BSEE) have been issued since 2014. This report highlights the achievements of the agency, its plans for the future and statistics of safety incidences.

BSEE FY Greenbook 
The BSEE Greenbook is the United States Department of the Interior's (DOI) budget justifications for the upcoming fiscal year.

Notice to Lessees (NTLs) & Letter to Lessees (LTLs) 
NTLs and LTLs are formal documents that clarify, describe and interpret BSEE regulations or Outer Continental Shelf (OCS) standards. They give guidelines in implementation of lease stipulations or regional requirements and explain the scope and meaning of a regulation. NTLs also may communicate administrative information including current telephone numbers and changes in addresses of BSEE offices or personnel.  NTLs and LTLs are currently archived on the BSEE’s website.

BSEE Data Center 
The BSEE maintains a database containing public information on various topics including leasing information, pipelines, permitting, platform/rig and production information; and statistics. Data is available in the form of online queries, PDFs, ASCII files and scanned documents. Information may be cross-referenced among different subject headings.

See also
Deepwater Horizon oil spill
Title 30 of the Code of Federal Regulations
United States Department of the Interior

References

Further reading

External links
Official website
Bureau of Safety and Environmental Enforcement in the Federal Register
SafeOCS Confidential Reporting System

2011 establishments in the United States
Environmental agencies in the United States
Government agencies established in 2011
Natural resources agencies in the United States
United States Department of the Interior agencies
Safety and Environmental